Xinavane is a town on the Incomati River, in the Manhiça District of Maputo Province, in Mozambique about 80 kilometres north of Maputo.

Economy
Tongaat Hulett Sugar grows sugarcane and operates a sugar mill at Xinavane.
In 2009 the sugar mill completed a major expansion, engineered and managed by PGBI Engineers & Constructors.

References

Manhiça District
Komati River
Populated places in Maputo Province